Hugh Strahan (born 24 June 1945) is a former Australian rules footballer who played for Geelong in the Victorian Football League (VFL) during the late 1960s and early 1970s.

A key position player, Strahan spent six seasons at Geelong and took part in their 1968 and 1969 finals campaigns.

The next stage of Strahan's career took place in Tasmania, who he represented in the 1975 Knockout Carnival. Strahan played with Cooee Football Club and was good performer for the North West Football Union in inter-league matches.
 
In 1977 he became coach of his original club, Newtown & Chilwell in Geelong.

References

Holmesby, Russell and Main, Jim (2007). The Encyclopedia of AFL Footballers. 7th ed. Melbourne: Bas Publishing.

1945 births
Living people
Geelong Football Club players
Cooee Football Club players
Newtown & Chilwell Football Club players
Australian rules footballers from Victoria (Australia)
People educated at Geelong College